Thomas McCarthy (also Tom and Tommy) may refer to:

Academia
Thomas A. McCarthy (born 1940), American professor of philosophy
Thomas J. McCarthy (born 1956), American professor of polymer chemistry at the University of Massachusetts
J. Thomas McCarthy, American law professor

Arts and entertainment
Thomas McCarthy (poet) (born 1954), Irish poet
J. Thomas McCarthy (born 1937), American educator, author and attorney
Tom McCarthy (director) (born 1966), American director, screenwriter and actor
Tom McCarthy (novelist) (born 1969), English novelist, writer, and artist
Tom McCarthy (sound editor), Academy Award-winning sound editor

Sports

Baseball
Tommy McCarthy (baseball) (1863–1922), MLB outfielder
Tom McCarthy (1900s pitcher) (1884–1933), Major League Baseball (MLB) pitcher, 1908–1909
Tom McCarthy (1980s pitcher) (born 1961), MLB pitcher, 1985–1989

Ice hockey
Tommy McCarthy (ice hockey) (1893–1959), NHL player for the Quebec Bulldogs and Hamilton Tigers
Tom McCarthy (ice hockey, born 1934) (1934–1992), NHL player for the Red Wings and Bruins
Tom McCarthy (ice hockey, born 1960) (1960–2022), NHL player for the North Stars and Bruins

Other sports
Thomas McCarthy (footballer) (1868–?), Welsh footballer
Thomas R. McCarthy (1933–2016), American Thoroughbred racehorse owner & trainer
Tommy McCarthy (hurler) (1906–1968), Irish hurler
Tom McCarthy (sportscaster) (born 1968), sports broadcaster
Tommy McCarthy (boxer) (born 1990), Irish boxer

Others
Thomas McCarthy (Syracuse politician) (1786–1848), businessman and political figure from Syracuse, New York
Thomas McCarthy (Canadian politician) (1832–1870), Quebec businessman and political figure
Tom McCarthy (trade unionist) (died 1899), British Irish trade union leader
Thomas Ignatius McCarthy (1880–1951), architect based in Coalville, Leicestershire
Thomas Joseph McCarthy (1905–1986), Canadian Roman Catholic clergyman and bishop